Vaes or VAES may refer to:

 Wouter Vaes, a Dutch professional darts player
 Stefaan Vaes, a Belgian mathematician
 VAES (instructions), vector AES instructions